Suliszewo  (formerly ) is a village in the administrative district of Gmina Drawsko Pomorskie, within Drawsko County, West Pomeranian Voivodeship, in north-western Poland.

For the history of the region, see History of Pomerania.

Notable residents
Gerhard Giesen (1890–1945), Wehrmacht officer

References

Suliszewo